Hannu Rantala (born 16 March 1936) is a Finnish athlete. He competed in the men's triple jump at the 1956 Summer Olympics and the 1960 Summer Olympics.

References

1936 births
Living people
Athletes (track and field) at the 1956 Summer Olympics
Athletes (track and field) at the 1960 Summer Olympics
Finnish male triple jumpers
Olympic athletes of Finland
Place of birth missing (living people)